Enteromius arcislongae is a species of ray-finned fish in the  family Cyprinidae. It is endemic to Lake Malawi,  and is found in Malawi, Mozambique, and Tanzania. Its natural habitats are rivers and freshwater lakes.

References

Enteromius
Taxa named by Ludwig Keilhack
Fish described in 1908
Taxonomy articles created by Polbot